The secretary of state of California is the chief clerk of the U.S. state of California, overseeing a department of 500 people. The secretary of state is elected for four year terms, like the state's other constitutional officers; the officeholder is restricted by term limits to two terms. The current secretary of state is Shirley Weber, who assumed the role following the resignation of Alex Padilla, who was appointed to become the U.S. Senator for California following Kamala Harris' resignation to become the Vice President of the United States.

Duties

Elections

The secretary of state is California's chief elections officer, overseeing all federal and state elections in the state and maintaining a database of registered voters. The officeholder is also responsible for disclosure of campaign and lobbyist financial information, under the California Political Reform Act of 1974.

Corporations
The Office of the Secretary of State has a number of responsibilities related to corporations; the largest portion office is the Business Programs Division, which handles corporate filings. The Business Entities Section processes, files and maintains records related to corporations, limited liability companies, partnerships and other business entities conducting or planning to conduct business in California.

Registries
The office also maintains a number of registries, including the Safe at Home confidential address program and the Domestic Partners and Advance Health Care Directive. Other roles of the secretary of state include safeguarding the California State Archives and sitting on the board of trustees of the California Museum, though the officeholder has not been responsible for the California State Library since 1862.

Organization
The Secretary of State's Office is divided into six main divisions:
Executive Division, which also includes the Office of Elections Cybersecurity and the Office of Voting Systems Technology Assessment.
Elections Division
Political Reform Division, which maintains the registry of lobbyists, campaign finances, etc.
Management Services Division, which includes accounting, human resources, building operations, etc.
Business Programs Division, which handles the registration of companies, notary services, etc.
State Archives, which also administers the State Museum that is a part of the Secretary of State's headquarters in downtown Sacramento.

The Secretary of State's Office also works in conjunction with the state Voting Modernization Board.

List of secretaries of state of California

See also
 Government of California
 Politics of California

References

External links